Jeff Coetzee and Rogier Wassen were able to emerge victorious at the 2007 Ordina Open Men's Doubles Competition.

Seeds

  Martin Damm /  Leander Paes (final)
  Lukáš Dlouhý /  Pavel Vízner (first round)
  Jeff Coetzee /  Rogier Wassen (champions)
  Jaroslav Levinský /  David Škoch (first round)

Draw

External links
Association of Tennis Professionals (ATP) draw

Men's Doubles
Ordina Open